Ursula Hess (born 7 August 1946) is a former Swiss archer. She competed at the 1984 Summer Olympics representing  Switzerland

See also 
 Switzerland at the 1984 Summer Olympics

References 

1946 births
Living people
Olympic archers of Switzerland
Archers at the 1984 Summer Olympics
Swiss female archers